Maddison Levi (born 27 April 2002) is an Australian rules footballer and rugby sevens player currently playing for Gold Coast in the AFL Women's competition (AFLW) and Australia women's sevens team.

Early life
Levi grew up on the Gold Coast and attended Miami State High School throughout her upbringing where she was a member of their Rugby Sevens Excellence Program. An accomplished junior rugby player, she represented Queensland as well as Australia in junior competitions and was named player of the tournament in the under-17 Youth Rugby Sevens National Championships. In 2018 Levi was asked to play Australian rules football for the first time with Miami High's AFLQ Schools Cup team and went on to play a pivotal role in the school's state championship win that year.

In 2019 she signed up to play club football for the first time with the Burleigh Bombettes and was placed in the Gold Coast Suns' developmental academy. Just months later, Levi was selected to represent Queensland as a bottom ager in the AFL Women's Under 18 National Championships. In 2020 she turned down a contract with Rugby Australia to pursue an AFLW career and switched clubs to play for Bond University in the top level QAFLW competition.  Levi cemented her spot in Bond University's senior team in 2020 and was named in the bests multiple times throughout the QAFLW season. As a result of her 2020 performances, she was invited to take part in the AFLW Draft Combine, where she broke multiple national records including the 20-metre sprint and vertical jump.

AFLW career
Levi was drafted to her hometown team, the Gold Coast Suns, with pick 50 in the 2020 AFL Women's draft. She made her AFLW debut for the Suns in Round 1 of the 2021 AFLW season and played every game for the Gold Coast that year while also being named equal leading goalkicker for the team in the 2021 season as well as finishing in the top 10 in the club's best and fairest count in her debut season.

Rugby sevens career

In July 2021, Levi was announced as a shock inclusion for the Australian national rugby sevens team in the Tokyo Olympics competition at 19 years of age. The team came second in the pool round and was eliminated by Fiji 14-12 in the quarterfinals. She then committed to playing for the national team in the 2021–22 World Rugby Women's Sevens Series where she scored 24 tries on route to Australia securing its third championship which included titles in Canada, Spain and the United Arab Emirates.

Levi won a gold medal with the Australian sevens team at the 2022 Commonwealth Games in Birmingham. She was a member of the Australian team that won the 2022 Sevens Rugby World Cup held in Cape Town, South Africa in September 2022, scoring a hat-trick of tries in the final against New Zealand.

Personal life
Her sister Teagan Levi also represents Australia at rugby sevens.

References

2002 births
Living people
Sportspeople from the Gold Coast, Queensland
Sportswomen from Queensland
Australian rules footballers from Queensland
Gold Coast Football Club (AFLW) players
Rugby sevens players at the 2020 Summer Olympics
Olympic rugby sevens players of Australia
Australian female rugby sevens players
Commonwealth Games gold medallists for Australia
Commonwealth Games medallists in rugby sevens
Rugby sevens players at the 2022 Commonwealth Games
Medallists at the 2022 Commonwealth Games